Crematogaster bison is a species of ant in tribe Crematogastrini. It was described by Forel in 1913.

References

bison
Insects described in 1913